Bill Wood  (born 4 November 1935) is an Australian politician who was a member of the Legislative Assembly of Queensland and later the Australian Capital Territory Legislative Assembly. He was elected to the Queensland Parliament as the Labor member for Cook in 1969, transferring in 1972 to the new seat of Barron River. He was defeated in 1974 by Country Party candidate Martin Tenni.

Wood was elected the first ACT Legislative Assembly in 1989, re-elected to the 2nd Assembly in 1992, elected to represent Brindabella in the Assembly in 1995, 1998 and 2001 general elections. He did not contest the 2004 ACT general election.

Wood was made a Member of the Order of Australia (AM) in the 2013 Australia Day Honours for "significant service to the community and the Legislative Assembly of the Australian Capital Territory".

Wood's identical twin brother Peter Wood, and their father Les Wood also served terms in the Queensland Parliament. Les was also briefly the leader of the Queensland ALP prior to his death in 1958.

References

1935 births
Living people
Australian Labor Party members of the Australian Capital Territory Legislative Assembly
Identical twin politicians
Members of the Queensland Legislative Assembly
Members of the Australian Capital Territory Legislative Assembly
Australian Labor Party members of the Parliament of Queensland
21st-century Australian politicians
Members of the Order of Australia